Gabriela Suppicich is an activist in the Workers' Party (Argentina).

She is a provincial deputy in Neuquén Province in Argentina.

She was elected as a candidate of the Workers' Left Front, she holds the post in rotation, and took over from Angelica Lagunas in December 2014.

She has previously worked as a social worker, and a lecturer at the National University of Comahue.

External links 
report (Spanish)
photo of her taking her seat

Living people
Workers' Party (Argentina) politicians
21st-century Argentine women politicians
21st-century Argentine politicians
People from Neuquén Province
Argentine social workers
Year of birth missing (living people)
Academic staff of the National University of Comahue